Princess Marie Agnes Henriette of Hohenlohe-Langenburg, full German name: Marie Agnes Henriette, Prinzessin zu Hohenlohe-Langenburg (5 December 1804 – 9 September 1835) was a member of the House of Hohenlohe-Langenburg and a Princess of Hohenlohe-Langenburg by birth. Through her marriage to Constantine, Hereditary Prince of Löwenstein-Wertheim-Rosenberg, Agnes was also a member of the House of Löwenstein-Wertheim-Rosenberg and Hereditary Princess of Löwenstein-Wertheim-Rosenberg. Through her daughter Adelaide of Löwenstein-Wertheim-Rosenberg, Agnes is an ancestor to numerous Roman Catholic European royal families.

Family
Agnes was the eleventh child of Karl Ludwig III, Prince von Hohenlohe-Langenburg and his wife Countess Amalie Henriette of Solms-Baruth.

Marriage and issue
Agnes married Constantine, Hereditary Prince of Löwenstein-Wertheim-Rosenberg, eldest child and only son of Karl Thomas, Prince of Löwenstein-Wertheim-Rosenberg and his wife Princess Sophie of Windisch-Grätz, on 31 May 1829 at Schloss Wildeck in Zschopau, Kingdom of Saxony. Agnes and Constantine had two children:

Adelaide of Löwenstein-Wertheim-Rosenberg (3 April 1831 – 16 December 1909). Married Miguel de Bragança.
Charles, 6th Prince of Löwenstein-Wertheim-Rosenberg (21 May 1834 – 8 November 1921). Married Princess Sophie of Liechtenstein. She was a daughter of Alois II, Prince of Liechtenstein and Countess Franziska Kinsky of Wchinitz and Tettau.

Ancestry

References

1804 births
1835 deaths
House of Hohenlohe-Langenburg
House of Löwenstein-Wertheim-Rosenberg
People from Langenburg
Princesses of Hohenlohe-Langenburg
Princesses of Löwenstein-Wertheim-Rosenberg